Henry Nathaniel Benson, Sr. (August 1, 1872 – May 10, 1960) was an American lawyer and politician. He served as Minnesota Attorney General from 1929 to 1933.

Benson was born in Norseland, Nicollet County, Minnesota. He was the son of Peter Benson and Malena (Pehrson) Benson. Benson received his bachelor's degree from Gustavus Adolphus College in 1893 and his law degree from University of Minnesota Law School in 1895. He then practiced law in St. Peter, Minnesota. Benson served as St. Peter city attorney and Nicollet County probate judge. Benson was active in the Republican Party. He served in the Minnesota State Senate from 1911 to 1923. Benson then served as Minnesota Attorney General from 1929 to 1933. He then continued his law practice in St. Peter, Minnesota.  He was also chairman of the Committee for the Augustana Pension Fund and   President of the Lutheran Brotherhood of the Augustana Lutheran Church.

Benson died in a hospital in St. Peter, Minnesota from complications from a hip fracture and surgery.

Notes

1872 births
1960 deaths
People from Nicollet County, Minnesota
Gustavus Adolphus College alumni
University of Minnesota Law School alumni
Minnesota state court judges
Minnesota Attorneys General
Republican Party Minnesota state senators
American Lutherans
American people of Swedish descent
People from St. Peter, Minnesota